Time Traveller is a box set by British rock band The Moody Blues, released in 1994. 

The set is presented in chronological order, beginning with the 1966 addition of Justin Hayward and John Lodge (no material from the pre-Hayward/Lodge era was included). The set includes several previously unreleased or rare tracks, tracks from the 1975 Hayward/Lodge side-project Blue Jays, the track "Forever Autumn" from Jeff Wayne's 1978 album War of the Worlds featuring Hayward on lead vocals and a new 1994 track, "This is the Moment", which had been released earlier that year as a contribution to the 1994 FIFA album Soccer Rocks the Globe.

Originally released as a 5-CD set, the fifth CD contains "This is the Moment" plus eight live recordings that were leftover from the original 1993 release of A Night at Red Rocks. These tracks were later included in the 2003 deluxe re-release of that album.

In 1996 Time Traveller was re-released as a 4-CD box set with CD 5 removed, thus this version of the set ends at the 1991 Keys of the Kingdom album.

Track listing

Disc One
All tracks performed by The Moody Blues

Tracks 1, 3–4, 9, 11, 13 and 15 written by Justin Hayward, tracks 2, 10 and 18–20 by Mike Pinder, track 5 by Hayward, Graeme Edge and Peter Knight, track 6 by Edge and John Lodge, tracks 7 and 14 by Ray Thomas, track 8 by Lodge, tracks 12 and 17 by Edge and track 16 by Hayward and Thomas

Disc Two
All tracks performed by The Moody Blues

Tracks 1, 5 and 11 written by Edge, tracks 2, 4, 8–10, 12, 14, 17 and 19 by Hayward, tracks 3, 7, 13 and 18 by Lodge, track 6 by Pinder and Lodge, track 9 by Hayward and Thomas, tracks 15 and 20 by Pinder and track 16 by Hayward, Lodge, Edge, Thomas and Pinder

Disc Three
All tracks performed by The Moody Blues except tracks 7–13 performed by Justin Hayward and John Lodge with track 13 featuring backing by 10cc

Track 1 written by Pinder, tracks 2, 7, 9, 11–13, 15–16 by Hayward, track 3 by Thomas, tracks 4, 6, 10 and 14 by Lodge, track 5 by Hayward and Edge and track 8 by Hayward and Lodge

Disc Four
All tracks performed by The Moody Blues except track 1 performed by Justin Hayward and Jeff Wayne

All tracks written by Hayward except track 1 by Jeff Wayne, Paul Vigrass and Gary Osborne, tracks 3, 6 and 14 by Lodge and track 4 by Hayward and Lodge

Disc Five (not included in 1996 re-release)
All tracks performed by The Moody Blues

All tracks written by Hayward except track 1 by Frank Wildhorn and Leslie Bricusse, track 5 by Lodge, track 8 by Thomas and track 9 by Hayward and Lodge

Certifications

References

1994 compilation albums
Albums produced by Tony Visconti
Polydor Records compilation albums
PolyGram compilation albums
The Moody Blues compilation albums